Yoel Alejandro Daboín Trivino (born 31 August 2004) is a Venezuelan footballer who plays as a forward for  Portuguesa FC.

Career statistics

Club

Notes

References

2004 births
Living people
Venezuelan footballers
Association football forwards
Venezuelan Primera División players
Trujillanos FC players